The K. C. DeRhodes House was built for newlyweds Laura Caskey Bowsher DeRhodes and Kersey C. DeRhodes in 1906 by Frank Lloyd Wright. It is a Prairie style home located at 715 West Washington Street in South Bend, Indiana.  The home was carefully restored by Tom and Suzanne Miller over more than four decades and remains in private ownership.  It is one of two Wright homes in South Bend, the other being the Herman T. Mossberg Residence. It is one of eight Frank Lloyd Wright designed homes in Indiana, of which seven remain. It was also the first home Frank Lloyd Wright built in Indiana.

The house

The DeRhodes house floor plan is nearly identical to—but on a 90-degree axis in relation to the front porch—the 1903-1904 Barton House in Buffalo, New York.  Oriented south to north, the main floor is one large rectangular space subdivided by piers and low bookcases with light screens into three spaces: a reception area, a large living room with fireplace toward the south (front) and a large dining room with Wright's customary built-in china cabinets toward the (north) rear.  An entry/foyer to the east and the stairway and kitchen wing to the west extend the plan into a cruciform shape.  Terraces protected by low walls at the north and south ends of the house extend the living space into the surrounding landscape. The downstairs maid's room in this house has been converted to a half bath.

The exterior of the DeRhodes house exhibits many of the features associated with Wright's Prairie School architecture:  the stucco exterior with wood trim, the strong water table, the pronounced horizontal lines of the continuous window sills and terrace parapets, the leaded glass "light screens" of the windows, the grouping of the windows into continuous bands, and the low-profile hip roof.

The celebrated rendering of the DeRhodes house by Wright's assistant Marion Mahony Griffin is considered by scholars to be among the best to emerge from the Oak Park Studio, and was thought so by Wright himself, who inscribed it "Drawn by Mahony after FLLW and Hiroshige".

The clients
 Laura Caskey Bowsher DeRhodes (November 5, 1864 – May 27, 1952)

Laura Caskey was born in Ligonier, Indiana, the daughter of Lutheran clergyman Curtis Caskey and his wife Margaret.  Before her marriage to Kersey C. DeRhodes, Laura Caskey was the second wife of South Bend industrialist-millionaire Nelson Prentice Bowsher (1845-1898), also a native of Ligonier, Indiana. Bowsher rose from being an inventor and master mechanic at the Oliver Chilled Plow Works to the proprietor of his own manufacturing business, N. P. Bowsher.  By his first wife, Clarissa C. Hostetter, Bowsher had two sons, Delavan Denis Bowsher and Jay C. Bowsher.  Prior to her marriage to DeRhodes, Laura lived in the Bowsher family home at 805 West Washington, South Bend.

 Kersey C. DeRhodes (February 7, 1862 – March 25, 1944)

Kersey C. DeRhodes was born in Fairfield, Ohio, the son of farmer David and his wife Madi DeRhodes.  After coming to South Bend in 1901, DeRhodes served as the cashier of the Merchant's National Bank (later the National Bank).  He also served as the treasurer of the Williams-Forrest Machine Company. From 1923 to 1935, he was president of DeRhodes-Yarrick Motor Co., a Dodge Brothers motor car dealership in South Bend. His residence before his marriage to Laura C. Bowsher was at 329 West Colfax Avenue, now the site of the First Presbyterian Church of South Bend.  From a prior marriage, he had one daughter, Hazel M. DeRhodes (July 10, 1888 - January 1975), who lived with Kersey and Laura DeRhodes in their Wright designed home before moving to Detroit, Michigan, as an adult.

In early 1906, Laura C. Bowsher visited with her South Bend friend Isabel Roberts (of the Isabel Roberts House) in Berwyn, Illinois.  Isabel was an architectural designer and draughtsman in Wright's Oak Park Studio and through Isabel, Laura met architect Frank Lloyd Wright, who was at the peak of his acclaim with the success of his prairie houses.  She commissioned Wright's Oak Park studio to design a house for her to be located at 715 West Washington Street, which was to be completed in time to move into it with her new husband.  Isabel Roberts stated that she was the designer of this house, although since it came from Wright's studio it has always been attributed to him.

On September 22, 1906, in Berwyn, Illinois, Laura Caskey Bowsher and Kersey C. DeRhodes were married; the officiating minister was Frank Lloyd Wright's uncle, the Rev. Jenkin Lloyd Jones.

Laura and Kersey DeRhodes lived in their Wright-designed house the rest of their lives; they were South Bend social and civic leaders.  DeRhodes' later business pursuits included the Vernon Clothing Company, the DeRhodes Motor Company (selling Dodge automobiles and Graham trucks).  The DeRhodes were members of the First Methodist Church of South Bend.  Laura was a member of the Progress Club.

Laura DeRhodes was still living in the house in 1940 when she was interviewed by Wright researcher Grant Manson, whose notes of the interview are in the Oak Park, Illinois public library. Laura lived in the house for the rest of her life, dying there in May 1952. Both are buried in the Highland Cemetery Mausoleum, South Bend.

"Shortly after Laura Bowsher's death," the current owner says, "Frank Lloyd Wright visited South Bend to deliver a lecture at the University of Notre Dame. He tried to buy back the original items from the home." Instead, contents went to Laura's four principal heirs.

In her will, Laura DeRhodes left the Wright-designed home to the First Methodist Church of South Bend to be used as a parsonage, but it never served that function. The household goods were to be divided among First Methodist Church (who selected only the baby grand piano), the Progress Club (which took only the lawn mower and silver), the YWCA and the Camp Fire Girls (who received about half of the home's furnishings including the fire screen and andirons).

The later whereabouts of the furnishings remain unknown.

In 1954 the Methodist Church sold the house. It was used by a Masonic lodge as the Avalon Grotto clubhouse from 1954 until 1978. During that time, much of the interior was painted and the main fireplace was covered over.

In 1978, Thomas and Suzanne Miller of South Bend bought the home for $67,000, the South Bend Tribune reported, and completed a total restoration over the next several decades. Tom Miller died in 2018 and Suzanne Miller died on May 10, 2021. In the spring of 2021, shortly before Suzanne's death, the Frank Lloyd Wright Building Conservancy recognized the significant work that the Millers did to preserve and restore the DeRhodes House by honoring them with its coveted Wright Spirit Award. The award was introduced in 1991 and recognizes the efforts of extraordinary individuals and organizations that have preserved the legacy of Wright through their tireless dedication and persistent efforts.

The Estate of Suzanne Miller placed the home on the market in the fall of 2021; it was sold to former US Ambassador to Malta Douglas Kmiec for $750,000. However, Ambassador Kmiec was unable to occupy the home, and sold the home to local attorney Andrew B. Jones and software CEO Stephanie (Steffi) Decker in February 2022 for $775,000.

References

 Storrer, William Allin. The Frank Lloyd Wright Companion. University Of Chicago Press, 2006,  (S.125)

Frank Lloyd Wright buildings
Buildings and structures in South Bend, Indiana
Houses in St. Joseph County, Indiana
Houses completed in 1906
1906 establishments in Indiana
Prairie School architecture in Indiana
Marion Mahony Griffin